Stefano Mei (born 3 February 1963 in La Spezia) is an Italian long-distance runner who specialized in the 5000 and 10000 metres. European champion on 10000 m in 1986.

From 31 January 2021 he is the new president of Italian Athletics Federation (FIDAL).

Biography
Stefano Mei won eight medals, at senior level, at the International athletics competitions. He participated at two editions of the Summer Olympics (1984 and 1988), he has 42 caps in national team from 1981 to 1994. In his career he won 8 times the national championships. Since 2 December 2012 Stefano Mei was Federal Councillor of the Federazione Italiana di Atletica Leggera (FIDAL), in the Franco Arese leaderships.

Achievements

National titles
Stefano Mei has won 8 times the individual national championship.
4 wins in 5000 metres at the Italian Athletics Championships (1984, 1986, 1989, 1991)
1 win in 1500 metres at the Italian Athletics Championships (1985) 
3 wins in 3000 metres at the Italian Athletics Indoor Championships (1985, 1986, 1989)

See also
 Italian all-time lists - 1500 metres
 Italian all-time lists - 5000 metres
 Italian all-time lists - 10000 metres
 FIDAL Hall of Fame

References

External links
 
 Interview: Stefano Mei

1963 births
Living people
People from La Spezia
Italian male long-distance runners
Athletes (track and field) at the 1984 Summer Olympics
Athletes (track and field) at the 1988 Summer Olympics
Olympic athletes of Italy
Athletics competitors of Fiamme Oro
European Athletics Championships medalists
European athletics champions for Italy
World Athletics Championships athletes for Italy
Universiade medalists in athletics (track and field)
Universiade gold medalists for Italy
Medalists at the 1989 Summer Universiade
Sportspeople from the Province of La Spezia